Fújì is a popular Yoruba musical genre. It arose from the improvisational wéré music, also known as ajísari (meaning "waking up for sari"), a genre of music performed to wake Muslims before dawn during the Ramadan fasting season. Alhaji Sikiru Ayinde Barrister popularized wéré music during the 1950s and 60s and conceived the term "fújì" in an unusual way. According to Barrister, "I came up with it when I saw a poster at an airport, advertising the Mount Fuji, which is the highest peak in Japan." Fújì should not be mistaken for the Yorùbá words "fuja" or "faaji," which mean leisure or enjoyment.

History
Wéré music is an Islamic-influenced Yorùbá genre of music invented by Muslim singers and musicians in Yorùbá towns and cities in southwestern Nigeria to wake Muslims fasting during Ramadan. Toward the end of the colonial period during the 1950s, Alhaji Dauda Epo-Akara and Ganiyu Kuti (Gani Irefin) founded and popularized wéré in Ibadan. Throughout the 1950s and 60s, numerous wéré performance groups emerged within Muslim communities in and around the cities of Ibadan, Lagos, and Ìlọrin. These early performers drew great inspiration from Yoruba sákárà music, featuring the sákárà drum (without the violin-like goje often played with an accompanying fiddle). Notable Lagos-based wéré performers during the early independence years include Sikiru Omo Abiba, Ajadi Ganiyu, Ayinde Muniru Mayegun (General Captain), Ajadi Bashiru, Sikiru Onishemo, Kawu Aminu, Jibowu Barrister, Ayinde Fatayi, Kasali Alani, Saka Olayigbade, Ayinla Yekinni, and Bashiru Abinuwaye.

As various styles evolved, some performers played mouth organs (harmonicas) between wéré interludes within their compositions. Sikiru Ayinde Barrister was the lead singer and composer of the popular wéré group, Jibowu Barrister, under the leadership of Alhaji Jibowu Barrister. During the 1960s, Sikiru Ayinde Barrister and other young wéré groups rocked Lagos and its environs.

In one of his early albums, chiding and educating critics who dubbed fújì a "local music," Sikiru Ayinde Barrister described fújì music as a combination of music consisting of sákárà, Apala, jùjú, Aro, Afrobeat, gudugudu, and some elements of highlife. Sikiru Ayinde Barrister did a tremendous job popularizing fújì by taking it all over the world. He started touring the European continent, especially England, during the 1970s and later the United States throughout the 1980s. Sikiru Ayinde Barrister toured internationally before any subsequent fújì bands toured outside of Nigeria.

Between 1970 and throughout the 1980s, other fújì musicians included Fatai Adio, Saura Alhaji, Student Fuji, Rahimi Ayinde (Bokote), Ramoni Akanni, Love Azeez, Waidi Akangbe, Sikiru Olawoyin, Agbada Owo, Iyanda Sawaba, Ejire Shadua, Wahabi Ilori, Wasiu Ayinde Marshall, Suleiman Adigun, Sakaniyau Ejire, and Wasiu Ayinla. As each artist became prolific, each invented and introduced his unique style of fújì music.

While male musicians have dominated fuji, reflecting fuji’s origins in wéré music, women artists have developed fújì-related styles called Islamic and wákà. Islamic is a popular name for this genre of women’s fújì-related music, particularly in and around the city of Ìlọrin, while wákà is a more general pan-Yoruba term for this Muslim women’s genre. These styles emerged in the late 1950s and were originally performed by women vocalists for Islamic events such as weddings and celebrations for pilgrims returning from Mecca. Since the 1980s, professional Muslim women vocalists have fronted their own bands which are identical to fújì bands in their instrumentation. While the themes and aesthetics of Islamic are more closely related to Muslim morality than fújì, there is significant overlap between women’s genres and fújì. The majority of Islamic and waka bandleaders and back-up vocalists are women, while the rest of their bands are typically men. Women performers of Islamic and wákà have a dominant presence on stage and in videos.

Modernization
During the early 1970s, Alhaji Kolington Ayinla (Baba Alatika or Kebe-n-Kwara) became a prolific fújì performer and Barrister's long-term musical rival. Wasiu Ayinde Marshall Barrister (K1 De Ultimate) gradually emerged (with hits such as "Talazo Fuji") after tutelage under Sikiru Ayinde Barrister. For 15 years, Wasiu Ayinde served under Sikiru Ayinde Barrister in various roles, including as his instrument packer and notably as his road manager. Wasiu Ayinde's style evolved through the early 1990s as he added youthful vigor to a genre dominated by aging frontmen. By the end of the 1990s, Wasiu Ayinde's brand of fújì had become one of the most popular dance genres in Nigeria. Another artist, Adewale Ayuba, took the nation by storm in the early 1990s with his unique brand of fújì, "Bonsue Fújì," which appealed to young and old alike. Abass Akande Obesere (Omo rapala) also became popular in the 1990s, known for bringing street slang, "asakasa," into the fújì scene. Since fújì's origin and presently, most lyrics of fújì songs are in the Yorùbá language. Notably, fújì fusions with other genres often include lyrics in the English or Nigerian Pidgin languages in addition to the Yorùbá language. Due to its popularity with young Nigerians, fújì hook lines often become the main hook lines of Nigerian hip-hop music.

Continued growth
Popular modern fújì musicians in Nigeria include Rasheed Ayinde Adekunle Merenge, Abass Akande obesere (PK 1), Sir Shina Akanni, Alhaji Isiaka Iyanda Sawaba, Adewale Ayuba, Wasiu Alabi, (Oganla 1) King Dr.Saheed Osupa (His Majesty), Late Sunny T Adesokan (Omo Ina ton ko fújì), Alayeluwa Sulaimon Alao Adekunle Malaika (KS1, Original ), Shefiu Adekunle Alao (Omo Oko), Sule Adio (Atawéwé), Tajudeen Alabi Istijabah (Oju Kwara), Wasiu Ajani (Mr. Pure Water), Taiye Currency, Alhaji Komi Jackson, Remi Aluko(Igwe fújì), Muri Alabi Thunder, Karube Aloma, Oyama Azeez (Arabesa, Alapatinrin, The Modern Real Fuji Creator), Murphy Adisa Sabaika (Madiba 2), Abiodun Ike Minister (Aremo Alayeluwa), Tunde Ileiru, Karubey Shimiu, Adeolu Akanni (Paso Egba), Shamu Nokia, (Quintessential) Sunny Melody, Olusegun Ologo, Segun Michael, Bola Abimbola, and Sulaimon Alao Adekunle (KS1 Malaika).

Today, fújì music has continued to attract younger generations. In the 2000s, many popular and successful fújì artists have emerged, including Shanko Rasheed, Wasiu Container, Cripsymixtee, Konkolo Wally G, Global T, and Muri Ikoko. In this generation of singers, Wasiu Ayinde Marshal continues to be the most recognizable name in the genre. Since their rise to popularity in the 1990s, Abass Akande Obesere, Wasiu Alabi Pasuma (Oganla Fuji), and King Saheed Osupa also continue to dominate the fújì scene into the present.

Notes

External links
 africasounds.com - "FUJI BUBBLE" by Hortense Fuller

Nigerian styles of music
Yoruba music
African popular music
Popular music